In Greek mythology, Hellen is the eponymous progenitor of the Hellenes. He is the child of Deucalion (or Zeus) and Pyrrha, and the father of three sons, Dorus, Xuthus, and Aeolus, by whom he is the ancestor of the Greek peoples.

Family 

The Catalogue of Women (sixth century BC?) is a fragmentary poem attributed to Hesiod; the work is structured around a large genealogy of mortals, Hellen's family being described in Book 1 of the poem. According to a scholion on Apollonius of Rhodes' Argonautica, Hellen, in the poem, is called the son of Pyrrha, by either Deucalion, or alternatively, by Prometheus (who is called the father of Deucalion in the same passage). The latter parentage, however, it seems was not a part of the Catalogue, but rather a mistake on the part of the scholion. A scholion on the Odyssey similarly calls Hellen a son of Deucalion and Pyrrha, giving his siblings as Amphictyon, Protogeneia, and Melanthea (Melantho). The scholion, however, also states that "some say that Hellen was the son of Zeus by birth but was said to be the son of Deucalion", leading M. L. West to consider Hellen's real father in the Catalogue to in fact be Zeus, and Deucalion only, in West's words, his "nominal father".

Plutarch, in his Moralia, quotes a passage from the Catalogue in which Hellen is the father of three sons, Dorus, Xuthus, and Aeolus. He does not, however, give the source of the passage; it is instead the Byzantine poet John Tzetzes who attributes it to the Catalogue. Though no mother is specified in the passage, West suggests that she was one "Othryis", the nymph of Mount Othrys, based upon the mothers given by Apollodorus and a scholion on Plato's Symposium (see below).

A scholion on Thucydides' History of the Peloponnesian War attributes to Hecataeus (c. 550 BC – c. 476 BC) a very different genealogy of Hellen, in which he is not the son of Deucalion but rather the grandson, being the son of one "Pronous", himself the son of Deucalion, alongside "Orestheus" and "Marathonius". According to a scholion on Plato's Symposium citing Hellanicus (fl. late fifth century BC), Hellen "was born to Deukalion and Pyrrha, or according to some, to Zeus and Pyrrha", and was the father, by "Othreis", of Dorus, Xuthus, Aeolus, and in addition a daughter, named Xenopatra.

Conon (before 444 BC – after 394 BC), in his Narrations (as recounted by Photius) similarly considers Hellen the son of Deucalion (though "some" says is the son of Zeus), and the father of Dorus, Xuthus, Aeolus. A scholion on Pindar, in contrast, makes Deucalion the brother of Hellen (rather than the father), and them both sons of Prometheus.

Vitruvius (c. 80–70 BC – after c. 15 BC), in his De Architectura, calls Dorus the son of Hellen by the "nymph Phthia", while Dionysius of Halicarnassus (c. 60 BC – after 7 BC) apparently considered Amphictyon to be Hellen's son (usually Hellen's brother).

Hyginus (c. 64 BC – AD 17), in his Fabulae, at one point calls Hellen the son of Zeus by Pyrrha, while later, he is listed among the sons of Poseidon, where he is called his son by Antiope (the son of Aeolus, who is usually Hellen's descendant), and the brother of Boeotus.

According to the mythographer Apollodorus (first or second century AD), Hellen's parents are Deucalion and Pyrrha, and his siblings Amphictyon and Protogeneia, or according to "some", his parents are Zeus and Pyrrha. Apollodorus, similarly to the Catalogue and other sources, calls him the father of Dorus, Xuthus and Aeolus; however, he specifies the nymph Orseis (rather than Othreis) as their mother.

According to the Byzantine chronicler John Malalas (c. 491 – 578), Hellen was the son of "Picus Zeus", and the father (rather than son) of Deucalion. According to Stephanus of Byzantium (fl. 6th century AD), the historian Archinus had Hellen as the father of one "Neonus", father of "Dotus", the latter of which gave his name to Dotium in Thessaly.

Progenitor and Eponym of the Hellenes 

Hellen was Thessalian. Homer, in the part of the Iliad known as the Catalogue of Ships, mentions the Hellenes as a small tribe in Thessalic Phthia, among those commanded by Achilles. Similarly, according to a scholion on Apollonius of Rhodes, Hecataeus and "Hesiod" considered Deucalion's descendants to be Thessalian. According to Thucydides, Achaea Phthiotis, as the birthplace of Hellen, was the home of the Hellenes; he says that before Hellen the name "Hellas" didn't exist, but rather there were various tribes which went under different names, particularly "Pelasgian". It was only when Hellen and his sons "grew strong in Phthiotis" that they allied with various cities in war and these cities, one by one, through their association with Hellen and his sons, came to be called "Hellenes", though it was a long time before the name came to be applied to all.

Melanippe Wise 

Though primarily genealogical in importance, Hellen does feature briefly in Euripides' lost play Melanippe Wise (c. 420 BC). In the play, Melanippe, the daughter of Aeolus (and thus the granddaughter of Hellen), becomes by Poseidon the mother of twins, Aeolus and Boeotus. They are placed in a cowshed, leading Aeolus to think they are the "unnatural offspring of a cow", and Hellen convinces Aeolus to burn the twins. This story is depicted on an Apulian volute krater dating to the late 4th century BCE, in which a shepherd shows the twins to Hellen, in the presence of Melanippe, Aeolus, and Aeolus' son Cretheus.

Genealogy

See also 
 Names of the Greeks

Notes

References 

 Apollodorus, Apollodorus. The Library, Volume I: Books 1-3.9, translated by James G. Frazer, Loeb Classical Library No. 121, Cambridge, Massachusetts, Harvard University Press, 1921. . Online version at Harvard University Press. Online version at the Perseus Digital Library.
 Asquith, Helen, "From genealogy to Catalogue: the Hellenistic adaptation of the Hesiodic catalogue form", in The Hesiodic Catalogue of Women: Constructions and Reconstructions, edited by Richard Hunter, Cambridge University Press, 2005. .
 Bing, Peter, "Afterlives of a Tragic Poet: Anecdote, Image and Hypothesis in the Hellenistic Reception of Euripides", in Antike Und Abendland, Vol. 57, No. 1, pp. 1–17. Online version at De Gruyter.
 Bury, J. B., "The History of the Names Hellas, Hellenes", in The Journal of Hellenic Studies, Vol. 15, pp. 217–238. .
 Caduff, Gian Andrea, Antike Sintflutsagen, Gottingen, Vandenhoeck & Ruprecht, 1986. . Internet Archive.
 Cardin, Marta, and Filippomaria Pontani, "Hesiod's Fragments in Byzantium", in Poetry in Fragments: Studies on the Hesiodic Corpus and its Afterlife, edited by Christos Tsagalis, De Gruyter, 2017. . Online version at De Gruyter.
 Cufalo, Domenico, Scholia Graeca in Platonem, I: Scholia ad Dialogos Tetralogiarumi - VII Continens, Roma, Edizioni di storia e letteratura, 2007. .
 D'Alessio, Giovan Battista, "Ordered from the Catalogue: Pindar, Bacchylides, and Hesiodic genealogical poetry", in The Hesiodic Catalogue of Women: Constructions and Reconstructions, edited by Richard Hunter, Cambridge University Press, 2005. .
 Dindorf, Karl Wilhelm, Scholia Graeca in Homeri Odysseam, Volume II, Oxford, E. Typographeo Clarendoniano, 1855. Internet Archive. Online version at the Perseus Digital Library.
 Dionysius of Halicarnassus, Roman Antiquities, Volume II: Books 3-4, translated by Earnest Cary, Loeb Classical Library No. 347, Cambridge, Massachusetts, Harvard University Press, 1939. . Online version at Harvard University Press. Online version by Bill Thayer.
 Drachmann, Anders Bjørn, Scholia Vetera in Pindari Carmina, Vol. I: Scholia in Olympionicas, Bibliotheca Teubneriana, Leipzig, Teubner, 1903. Internet Archive. Online version at De Gruyter (1997 reprint). Online version at the Perseus Digital Library.
 Euripides, Fragments: Aegeus-Meleager, edited and translated by Christopher Collard and Martin Cropp, Loeb Classical Library No. 504, Cambridge, Massachusetts, Harvard University Press, 2008. . Online version at Harvard University Press.
 Fowler, R. L. (1998), "Genealogical thinking, Hesiod's Catalogue, and the Creation of the Hellenes", in Proceedings of the Cambridge Philological Society, Vol. 44, pp. 1–19. .
 Fowler, R. L. (2000), Early Greek Mythography: Volume 1: Text and Introduction, Oxford University Press, 2000. . Google Books.
 Fowler, R. L. (2013), Early Greek Mythography: Volume 2: Commentary, Oxford University Press, 2013. . Google Books.
 Gantz, Timothy, Early Greek Myth: A Guide to Literary and Artistic Sources, Johns Hopkins University Press, 1996, Two volumes:  (Vol. 1),  (Vol. 2).
 Grimal, Pierre, The Dictionary of Classical Mythology, Wiley-Blackwell, 1996. . Internet Archive.
 Hall, Jonathan M., "The Role of Language in Greek Ethnicities", in Proceedings of the Cambridge Philological Society, Vol. 41, pp. 83–100. .
 Hard, Robin, The Routledge Handbook of Greek Mythology: Based on H.J. Rose's "Handbook of Greek Mythology", Psychology Press, 2004. . Google Books.
 Harry, René, Photius: Bibliothèque. Tome III: Codices 186-222, Collection Budé, Paris, Les Belles Lettres, 1962. .
 Herodotus, The Persian Wars, Volume I: Books 1-2, translated by A. D. Godley, Loeb Classical Library No. 117, Cambridge, Massachusetts, Harvard University Press, 1920. . Online version at Harvard University Press. Online version at the Perseus Digital Library.
 Hesiod, Catalogue of Women, in Hesiod: The Shield, Catalogue of Women, Other Fragments, edited and translated by Glenn W. Most, Loeb Classical Library No. 503, Cambridge, Massachusetts, Harvard University Press, 2007, 2018. . Online version at Harvard University Press.
 Hirschberger, Martina, Gynaikōn Katalogos und Megalai Ēhoiai: Ein Kommentar zu den Fragmenten zweier hesiodeischer Epen, Munich and Leipzig, K. G. Saur Verlag, 2004. .
 Homer, Iliad, Volume I: Books 1-12, translated by A. T. Murray, revised by William F. Wyatt, Loeb Classical Library No. 170, Cambridge, Massachusetts, Harvard University Press, 1924. . Online version at Harvard University Press. Online version at the Perseus Digital Library.
 Hude, Karl, Scholia in Thucydidem, Bibliotheca Teubneriana, Leipzig, Teubner, 1927. Internet Archive (1973 reprint).
 Hunter, Richard, Hesiodic Voices: Studies in the Ancient Reception of Hesiod's Works and Days, Cambridge University Press, 2014. .
 Hyginus, Gaius Julius, Fabulae, in The Myths of Hyginus, edited and translated by Mary A. Grant, Lawrence: University of Kansas Press, 1960. Online version at ToposText.
 Hyginus, Gaius Julius, De Astronomica, in The Myths of Hyginus, edited and translated by Mary A. Grant, Lawrence: University of Kansas Press, 1960. Online version at ToposText.
 Leone, Pietro Luigi, Scholia vetera et paraphrases in Lycophronis Alexandram, Galatina, Congedo, 2002. .
 Malalas, John, The Chronicle of John Malalas, translated by Elizabeth Jeffreys, Michael Jeffreys and Roger Scott, Brill, 1986. . Online version at Brill.
 Merkelbach, R., and M. L. West, Fragmenta Hesiodea, Clarendon Press Oxford, 1967. .
 Nauck, Johann August, Tragicorum Graecorum Fragmenta, Bibliotheca Teubneriana, Leipzig, Teubner, 1889. Internet Archive.
 Papathomopoulos, Manolis, Exēgēsis Iōannou Grammatikou tou Tzetzou eis tēn Homērou Iliada, Athens, Akademia Athenon, 2007. .
 Plutarch, Moralia, Volume IX: Table-Talk, Books 7-9. Dialogue on Love, translated by Edwin L. Minar, F. H. Sandbach, and W. C. Helmbold, Loeb Classical Library No. 425, Cambridge, Massachusetts, Harvard University Press, 1961. . Online version at Harvard University Press.
 Smith, William, Dictionary of Greek and Roman Biography and Mythology, London (1873). Online version at the Perseus Digital Library.
 Solinus, "Gaius Iulius Solinus and his Polyhistor", translated by Arwen Elizabeth Apps, Ph.D. dissertation, Macquarie University, 2011. Online version at ToposText.
 Stephanus of Byzantium, Stephani Byzantii Ethnica: Volumen II Delta - Iota, edited by Margarethe Billerbeck and Christian Zubler, De Gruyter, 2011. . Online version at De Gruyter. Internet Archive. Google Books.
 Thucydides, The Peloponnesian War, London, J. M. Dent; New York, E. P. Dutton, 1910. Online version at the Perseus Digital Library.
 Trzaskoma, Stephen M., R. Scott Smith, and Stephen Brunet, Anthology of Classical Myth: Primary Sources in Translation, Hackett Publishing, 2004. . Google Books.
 Vitruvius, On Architecture, Volume I: Books 1-5, translated by Frank Granger, Loeb Classical Library No. 251, Cambridge, Massachusetts, Harvard University Press, 1931. . Online version at Harvard University Press.
 Wendel, Carl, Scholia in Apollonium Rhodium vetera, Hildesheim, Weidmann, 1999. .
 West, M. L. (1985), The Hesiodic Catalogue of Women: Its Nature, Structure, and Origins, Clarendon Press Oxford, 1985. .
 Yasumura, Noriko, Challenges to the Power of Zeus in Early Greek Poetry, Bloomsbury Academic, London, 2011. . Google Books.

Legendary progenitors
Kings in Greek mythology
Mythological kings of Thessaly
Deucalionids
Children of Zeus
Demigods in classical mythology
Thessalian characters in Greek mythology
Thessalian mythology